Tiotixene, or thiothixene, sold under the brand name Navane among others, is a typical antipsychotic of the thioxanthene class which is related to chlorprothixene and is used in the treatment of psychoses like schizophrenia and bipolar mania. It was introduced in the United States in 1967 by Pfizer.

Tiotixene is also related to thioproperazine and pipotiazine, members of the phenothiazine class.

Pharmacology

Pharmacodynamics

Tiotixene acts primarily as a highly potent antagonist of the dopamine D2 and D3 receptors (subnanomolar affinity). It is also an antagonist of the histamine H1, α1-adrenergic, and serotonin 5-HT7 receptors (low nanomolar affinity), as well as of various other receptors to a much lesser extent (lower affinity). It does not have any anticholinergic activity. Antagonism of the D2 receptor is thought to be responsible for the antipsychotic effects of tiotixene.

History
Tiotixene was introduced in 1967.

Chemistry
Tiotixene is a member of the thioxanthene class of antipsychotics. Analogues include chlorprothixene, clopenthixol, flupentixol, and zuclopenthixol.

References

5-HT7 antagonists
Alpha-1 blockers
Antihistamines
D2 antagonists
D3 antagonists
H1 receptor antagonists
Piperazines
Sulfonamides
Dimethylamino compounds
Thioxanthene antipsychotics